Oralia Dominguez (25 October 1925 in San Luis Potosí, Mexico – 25 November 2013 in Milan, Italy) was a Mexican operatic mezzo soprano who performed at many of the world's leading opera houses.

She was born in the city of San Luis Potosí in northern Mexico and studied at the National Conservatory of Music where she made the acquaintance of the composer Carlos Chavez who championed her career. She made her professional stage debut at the Mexico City Opera in 1950.

In 1951, she sang the role of Amneris in Aida for the first time at the Palacio de Bellas Artes in Mexico City with Maria Callas, Mario del Monaco, and Giuseppe Taddei under the direction of Italian conductor Oliviero De Fabritiis.

She made her European debut in 1953 at London's Wigmore Hall. In the same year, she first appeared at La Scala, Milan, in Adriana Lecouvreur, and performed with the company in Verdi's Requiem at the Lucerne Festival. She recorded the Requiem the following year under the direction of Victor de Sabata. In 1954, she appeared throughout Europe with such conductors as Tullio Serafin, Igor Markevitch, Paul Kletzki and Herbert von Karajan. In 1955, she made her debut at the Royal Opera House Covent Garden singing the role of Madame Sosostris in the world premiere of Michael Tippett's The Midsummer Marriage.  Also in England, she appeared at Glyndebourne in the late 1950s as Isabella in L'italiana in Algeri and Mistress Quickly in Falstaff; she appeared at Covent Garden in the latter role in 1967-8 as well.

In 1958, Dominguez was soloist in Gustav Mahler's Symphony no. 2 with Leonard Bernstein conducting the Orchestre National de la RTF. The performance took place in the Théatre des Champs-Èlysées in Paris.

Recordings
She performed the role of Erda in von Karajan's recording of Wagner's Ring with the Berlin Philharmonic. She recorded also Vivaldi's Juditha triumphans (under Alberto Zedda). Her other recordings, mainly live performances, include Samson et Dalila, Aida, La Gioconda (La Cieca), Il tabarro, Un ballo in maschera, Trovatore, Tippett's Midsummer Marriage (Madame Sosostris), Verdi's Requiem, Mozart's Requiem, Rossini's Petite messe solennelle, De Falla's El amor brujo, Mahler's Das Lied von der Erde, Brahms's Alto Rhapsody. She recorded Carmen (excerpts, in German) and a recital of arias (Donizetti, Rossini, Cilea, Verdi) made early in her career by Deutsche Grammophon which has been reissued.

On DVD is found a 1958 performance from Naples of La forza del destino, with the contralto as Preziosilla, opposite Renata Tebaldi, Ettore Bastianini, Franco Corelli, Boris Christoff, and Renato Capecchi.

References 

1925 births
2013 deaths
20th-century Mexican women opera singers
People from San Luis Potosí City
Operatic contraltos